Kamarbon may refer to:
 Kamarbon, Amol
 Kamarbon, Nur